This article discusses the organizational and administrative structure of the Polish–Lithuanian Commonwealth.

The Polish–Lithuanian Commonwealth was a confederative aristocratic republic of the period 1569–1795, comprising the Kingdom of Poland, the Grand Duchy of Lithuania and their fiefs. The Commonwealth was governed by the Parliament (Sejm) consisting of the King, the King-appointed Senate (Voivodes, Castellans, Ministers, Bishops) and the rest of hereditary nobility either in person or through the Lower Sejm (consisting of deputies representing their lands). The nobility's constitutional domination of the state made the King very weak and the commoners (burgesses and peasants) almost entirely unrepresented in the Commonwealth's political system.

Classification
The Commonwealth's administrative system was a pre-bureaucracy. In terms of Max Weber's tripartite classification of authority, it was, as with other contemporary monarchies, largely based on "traditional domination". There was, however, evidence of "rational-legal authority" in the nobility's respect for laws such as the Pacta conventa.

Senatorial offices 
The Privy council and Upper chamber of the First Commonwealth’s Sejm (parliament, or diet) was the Senat (now Senate), comprising Bishops, Voivode, Castellan and ministers (central officials). The list of dignitaries eligible to serve in the Senat had been finalized when, in the Union of Lublin (1569), the Kingdom of Poland and the Grand Duchy of Lithuania were transformed into the confederal state of Crown of Poland and Grand Duchy of Lithuania, the Polish–Lithuanian Commonwealth.

The most important official was the Primate, who was the Archbishop of Gniezno. From 1572, the first time that Poland had been without a king (the Jagiellon Dynasty having died out with King Zygmunt II August), the Archbishop of Gniezno served as interrex, i.e., as interim head of state until a new king could be elected. He represented the country and prepared elections for a new king.

In addition, the Archbishop of Gniezno had the power to call a new Senat session, if he deemed it important to do so, even in the absence of the King. He could also invoke the "de non praestanda obedientia" article, giving the country the right to legally depose the King. From among other senators, he chose his own court marshal (often a Castellan). That person acted as the Archbishop's messenger during Senat meetings, giving signs (by moving a cross) that conveyed how the Archbishop wished his allies to vote. The Archbishop of Gniezno had two deputies: the bishops of Wrocław and Poznań.

Of secular Senators, the foremost was the Castellan (Kasztelan) of Cracow. Other Castellans, however, were considered to be lesser dignitaries than the Voivodes.

The power of the Voivodes had declined since that title had been introduced about the 12th century; in the 17th century, however, they were still the highest regional dignitaries. They were the highest representatives of their Voivodeships to the Senat. They were the leaders of the Land Parliaments (Sejmiki Wojewódzkie, Voivodeship Sejmiks). They were in charge of assembling local nobility's military forces in the event of a pospolite ruszenie (levée en masse). Each chose a Deputy Voivode, who was responsible for setting local prices and measures. Voivodes were chosen by the King, except for those of Połock Voivode and Vilnius Voivode, who were elected by (and from) the local nobility (but still had to be appointed by the King).

Except for the Castellan of Cracow Land (which has its seat in a privileged city, as the Commonwealth's capital until 1596), Castellans were often considered subordinate to Voivodes. A Castellan was in charge of part of a Voivodeship (till the 15th century called a Castellany, and thereafter divided into provinces for Major Castellans and powiats for Minor Castellans).

After 1565, the principle of "incompatibilitas" ("incompatibility") forbade Voivodes and Castellans to hold a second title as a Minister, except for the post of Hetman. Ministers were comparable to modern central-government officials. They were 10 officials (5 for the Crown of Poland, 5 for Lithuania). The Ministers were the Grand Marshal of the Crown (Marszałek Wielki Koronny), Grand Marshal of Lithuania (Marszałek Wielki Litewski), Grand Chancellor of the Crown (Kanclerz Wielki Koronny), Grand Chancellor of Lithuania (Kanclerz Wielki Litewski), Vice-Chancellor of the Crown (Podkanclerzy Koronny), Vice-Chancellor of Lithuania (Podkanclerzy Litewski), Grand Treasurer of the Crown (Podskarbi Wielki Koronny), Grand Treasurer of Lithuania (Podskarbi Wielki Litewski), Court Marshal of the Crown (Marszałek Nadworny Koronny) and Court Marshal of Lithuania (Marszałek Nadworny Litewski). Court Marshals were considered subordinate to Grand Marshals. Lithuanian ministers, while vested with the same powers as Crown Ministers, were considered below them in precedence. Hetmans were also considered "Ministers" but had no seat in the Senat.

A Marshal's duties consisted in providing security to the King and keeping order where he was present. Marshals commanded two regiments of infantry, a regiment of militia, and a special court of law with a marshal's judge (sędzia marszałkowski), marshal's clerk (pisarz marszałkowski) and assessors (singular: asesor). These courts passed sentence on the spot, without possibility of appeal. For crimes such as drawing a weapon in the King's presence, the penalty was death. A Marshal's court had jurisdiction over all crimes committed against the royal court and by courtiers.

When the King traveled, Marshals supervised the local Voivodes. The Marshals decided who would be admitted to royal audience. They were the organizers and masters of royal and court ceremonies (including weddings, funerals and the like). They were the masters of the court, kept track of lesser courtiers, and (where applicable) set their salaries. Each Marshal wielded a marshal's staff, which he had received from the Chancellor (Kanclerz). In exchange, all Chancellor nominations were heralded by the Marshals. If no Marshal was present, his functions were carried out by a Grand Treasurer or secular Grand Chancellor. On formal occasions and during travel, where appropriate, a Marshal with his staff of office preceded the King. Close after the Marshals in the hierarchy were the Chancellors.

From 1507, the title of Grand Chancellor of the Crown was rotated between secular and ecclesiastic Chancellors. After the Union of Lublin (1569), the two offices, Chancellor (Kanclerz) and Vice-Chancellor (Podkanclerzy) were doubled (Chancellors of the Crown, for the Crown of Poland, and Chancellors of Lithuania). The Chancellor and his respective Vice-Chancellor (who was not a direct subordinate of the Chancellor) were responsible for the work of two Chancelleries, a Major and a Minor. These were expected to be in constant contact and to develop common policies. Their responsibilities included foreign and internal affairs.

The Chancellors' offices were the "Chancelleries" (Crown and Lithuanian, Major and Minor). The Chancelleries were staffed with a "Regens," Secretaries (singular: Sekretarz), Scriptors (singular: Pisarz), clerks and "metrykants." The Regens divided the work among the clerks. Two Secretaries (one for private, the other for official, correspondence) presented the ready letters to the King for signature. The Scriptors drafted the letters, the clerks prepared the final copies. The documents were also copied into books called "Metryki" (singular: Metryka), which were kept by two "metrykants", each, in Poland and Lithuania. The Grand Chancellor's Metrykant was called the Grand Metrykant, the Vice-Chancellor's was the Lesser Metrykant. The Chancelleries' staffs, like the Chancellors, received no wages, but the middle of each reception room featured a box into which clients were expected to deposit varying amounts of money, and no one who planned to return could afford to be stingy.

The Chancellors also had judiciary powers, exercised through assessors’ courts, which were the highest appellate courts for persons subject to crown law (i.e., not subject to ecclesiastic or magnat courts). Each such court was staffed by a secretary, Referendary (Referendarz) and writer. In the 17th century, each such court was enlarged to include four assessors; and, in 1775, a metrykants and a regens.

The Chancellor often gave speeches representing the royal will. The symbol of his office was the Seal, which was used to seal all documents passing through his office. He also sealed documents signed by the monarch, and could refuse to seal a document that he considered illegal or damaging to the state (such documents had no force without his seal). When the King died, the seal was destroyed at his funeral and a new one was issued to the Chancellor by the late King's successor. Therefore, the Chancellors were considered the guardians of the King and state, ensuring that the King's folly would not endanger the state by forcing it into an unnecessary war (the wars that were prevented by the Chancellors included a great crusade against the Ottoman Empire that King Władysław IV Waza had planned in the 1630s).

The Chancellor's powers tended to be reinforced by the fact that wars required funds that were appropriated by the Senate. The richer nobles who controlled the Senate were usually loath to increase and levy taxes upon themselves, which meant that Poland herself very rarely declared wars. Usually she was attacked by her neighbors, and while she repelled all attacks till the end of the 18th century, she almost never exploited her victories. The army was undermanned and underequipped (since usually any suggestion to augment the military budget when an enemy was not on the Commonwealth's doorstep was labeled as warmongering) and the Polish–Lithuanian Commonwealth's lands were constantly ravaged by new invasions that crippled the economy.

Last among the ministers were the Grand Treasurers. They kept accounts of the state finances, cash flow and State Treasury, and controlled the minting of coin. Since, like the Chancellors, they received no wages, corruption ran rampant and a sizable portion of state finances was lost in their pockets. If a Treasurer moved to another post, he was obliged to render accounts of his disbursements, and if he died, his family were required to produce them. A telling story is that of Bogusław Leszczyński, who while a Grand Treasurer (1650–1658) was offered a Chancellor's post, which he accepted in 1658. He bribed the members of the Parliament to grant him "absolution", and when one of them later opposed him, he asked, curious: "Who's this son of a bitch that I failed to pay off?"

Grand Treasurers supervised lesser officials such as the Master of the Mint (mincerz), dyspensators, kurators, tax collectors (poborca podatkowy), superintendents (overseer of customs officers), customs officers (celnik) and subkolektors. It should be remembered that, in those times, goods—as well as people—were taxed not only at borders but at bridges, crossroads and city gates.

List of Senatorial offices
 Marszałek Wielki Koronny – Grand Marshal of the Crown
 Marszałek Wielki Litewski – Grand Marshal of Lithuania
 Kanclerz Wielki Koronny – Grand Chancellor of the Crown
 Kanclerz Wielki Litewski – Grand Chancellor of Lithuania
 Podkanclerzy Koronny – Vice-Chancellor of the Crown
 Podkanclerzy Litewski – Vice-Chancellor of Lithuania
 Podskarbi Wielki Koronny – Grand Treasurer of the Crown
 Podskarbi Wielki Litewski – Grand Treasurer of Lithuania
 Marszałek Nadworny Koronny – Court Marshal of the Crown
 Marszałek Nadworny Litewski – Court Marshal of Lithuania
 Voivodes (Palatines) (singular: Palatinus) – an ancient dignity, merged with that of Palatines: Governors of Voivodeships. The number of Voivodes slowly increased when new Voivodeships were created; at its greatest extent, the Commonwealth had 37. See Voivodes of the Polish–Lithuanian Commonwealth for details.
 Kasztelanowie (singular: Kasztelan) – Castellans: heads of kasztelanie (castellanies). Their number also varied. The most important Castellan was that of Kraków, whose position in the hierarchy was actually superior to that of a Voivode. The Castellans were of three categories:
 Kasztelanowie Wyróżnieni – Distinguished Castellans (of Kraków, Vilnius and Trakai). They were seated among the Voivodes.
 Kasztelanowie Więksi (Krzesłowi) – Major Castellans (there were 31).
 Kasztelanowie Mniejsi (Drążkowi) – Minor Castellans (there were 49).
 Kasztelanowie Konarscy (Koniuszy) – Equerry Castellans (there were 3).
See Castellans of the Polish–Lithuanian Commonwealth for details.

The Senate also included Bishops of Poland. See Bishops of the Polish–Lithuanian Commonwealth for details. After 1668, though there was no law explicitly forbidding it, no non Roman Catholics were nominated to the senatorial offices. Even the 1717 laws did not forbid Calvinists or the Orthodox known as "dyssydents" to sit in the Senate.

Central non-Senat-related offices
As the name suggests, non-Senat-related officials were not entitled to a vote in the Senat.

The most important such officials were the Great Secretaries (singular: sekretarz wielki), Crown and Lithuanian. Only a man of the cloth could be a Great Secretary. These functionaries were considered more consequential than any district or court official, with the exception of the Court Marshal. They could act as Chancellors when no Chancellor was in attendance. They dealt with secret letters; in Senat they read out letters of the King's and resolutions of the Sejm. The Great Secretaries often acted as Assessors  and were called "innate Assessors."

Next were 4 Referendaries (singular: referendarz), 2 secular and 2 ecclesiastic, one each for the Crown and for Lithuania. They rarely left the royal court, and their duties consisted in hearing petitions and complaints, which they referred (hence their name) to the King. They also acted as judges in cases involving peasants from the King's lands, and often acted as Assessors at other courts. Close to the office of Referendary was that of the "Instygator"—what today would be termed a State Prosecutor. One each for Crown and for Lithuania, the Instygators were tasked with uncovering and dealing with crimes against the King and the country, and were authorized to prosecute any dignitary save the King. They had deputies known as "viceinstygators."

Then came the Great Writers (singular: pisarz wielki)—one for the Crown, three for Lithuania. It was their task to clarify royal decrees and send letters to those dignitaries who must hear of them. They often acted as ambassadors and Assessors.

The Crown Keeper (kustosz koronny) was the official responsible for safeguarding the Royal Treasury, where the royal insignia were kept. The keys to the Treasury were held by the Great Treasurer and six voivods, and without each of them, the Treasury could not be opened. Traditionally, the Crown Keeper was chosen from among the priests of Kraków Cathedral. The Lithuanian Keeper was actually called a Treasurer (skarbny).

From 1647, the ministers were joined by a Postmaster General (Poczmistrz generalny, also known as Poczmistrz naczelny or Generał poczmistrz), the supervisor of the Royal Post, founded in 1547.

In principle, Polish–Lithuanian officials enjoyed life tenure. Of several notable exceptions to that rule, the most important involved the Senat Marshal, who chaired Senat meetings and could suggest, but not determine, the subject of a meeting. Traditionally, the post of Senat Marshal rotated among Senators from the three prowincyje ("provinces" – major divisions) of the Republic, or Commonwealth: Wielkopolska ("Greater Poland") and Małopolska ("Lesser Poland"), in the "Polish Crown"; and the Grand Duchy of Lithuania.

The office of Marshal of the Sejm (Marszałek Sejmu) existed only during sessions of the Commonwealth's parliament (the Sejm). The Marshal chose the Secretary of the Sejm (sekretarz sejmowy), who kept the records of Sejm meetings.

The highest court for nobles was called the Crown Tribunal (Trybunł Koronny, created 1579) and was headed by a Tribunal President and a Marshal. The Marshal was chosen from and by the judges themselves, while the President dealt with ecclesiastic matters (and was himself a high-ranking priest). There was also a Lithuanian Tribunal (Trybunał Litewski) and Crown and Lithuanian Treasury courts, created in 1613 (Trybunał Skarbowy Koronny, Trybunał Skarbowy Litewski). Salaries for all judges were set at Sejm meetings.

Salt mines (żupy solne) were supervised by a żupnik. Other less important dignitaries named by the King or Sejm to deal with specific short-term questions were called "commissars", "lustrates", "revisers", "delegates", "legates" or "deputies."

Court offices
Official court posts are the most difficult to describe. Some court officials held responsibilities important to both the court and the country; the functions of others evolved over the centuries. In time (generally by the end of the 17th century), the titles of most had become merely honorary, and the King had to create another set of officials to deal with those responsibilities.

Court officials may be divided into those who served the King, and those who ensured the smooth running of his court (in the 16th century, comprising some 1,000–1,500 persons). Since the first group were not subject to the principle of incompatibilitas, they often held another title, usually that of a lesser district official such as a starosta. Of those who served the King, the most important was the Master of the Kitchen, who supervised the kitchen staff and equipment and the preparation of foods. During feasts, he announced the successive dishes.

Second in importance was the Pantler, who began setting the table. During feasts, he directed the setting of the dishes, aided by the Steward. The Carver finished setting the table with plates and utensils, and during the feast carved all the dishes that required the knife. After carving, he tasted them (by the 17th century, this was merely a tradition, left over from the days when this official used to detect poison).

Drink was seen to by the Cupbearer and the Royal Cupbearer. The first tasted of the drinks, poured them and ordered them; the second, upon receiving them from the former, served them to the King. A description of a 1596 banquet in the reign of King Sigismund III Vasa was set down by the secretary to the Papal Nuncio (ambassador), Giorgio Paolo Mucante: "Each dish was first given, with a bow, by the Master of the Kitchen to the Carver, who passed it to the Pantler. The latter dipped a prepared piece of bread into the dish, touched it to his tongue, then discarded it into a nearby silver bin. It took quite a while before the King and the Cardinal could begin eating, as they had to bear with all the ceremonies. The Carver bowed so often that I truly think that during the feast he bowed at least 3,000 times."

A second set of dignitaries was headed by the Court Marshal (see above):
 Chamberlain – in charge of the King's court and the domestic economy on Crown estates;
 Standard-bearer – carried the King's or the country's banner;
 Sword-bearer – carried the sword before the King;
 Equerry – in charge of the King's stables and stud;
 Master of the Hunt – organized hunts, guarded the royal forests against poachers;
 Court Treasurer – managed the King's finances, kept accounts of his personal treasure, and supervised the court's treasures;
 Royal Secretaries – dealt with the King's personal correspondence;
 Royal Chaplain – conducted court masses, supervised the liturgical treasures, and oversaw the court musicians;
 and many other dignitaries, of progressively less importance, dealing with matters such as food supplies, transportation, etc.

The Queen had her own court, staffed with women; its influence in the country was much smaller.

List of court offices
 Sekretarz wielki koronny i litewski – Crown and Lithuanian Grand Secretary;
 Referendarz koronny i litewski – Crown and Lithuanian Referendary;
 Podskarbi nadworny koronny i litewski – Crown and Lithuanian Court Treasurer;
 Podkomorzy nadworny koronny i litewski – Crown and Lithuanian Court Chamberlain;
 Chorąży wielki koronny i litewski – Crown and Lithuanian Grand Standard-bearer;
 Chorąży nadworny koronny i litewski – Crown and Lithuanian Court Standard-bearer;
 Miecznik koronny i litewski – Crown and Lithuanian Sword-bearer;
 Kuchmistrz koronny i litewski – Crown and Lithuanian Master of the Kitchen;
 Koniuszy koronny i litewski – Crown and Lithuanian Equerry;
 Podczaszy koronny i litewski – Crown and Lithuanian Royal Cupbearer;
 Krajczy koronny i litewski – Crown and Lithuanian Carver;
 Stolnik koronny i litewski – Crown and Lithuanian Pantler;
 Podstoli koronny i litewski – Crown and Lithuanian Steward;
 Cześnik korony – Crown Cupbearer;
 Łowczy koronny i litewski – Crown and Lithuanian Master of the Hunt;
 Łowczy nadworny – Court Master of the Hunt;
 Regent kancelarii koronny i litewski – Court and Lithuanian Regent of the Chancellery;
 Metrykant koronny i litewski – Crown and Lithuanian Record-keeper;
 Pisarz sądowy koronny i litewski – Crown and Lithuanian Judicial Notary;
 Pisarz wielki koronny i litewski – Crown and Lithuanian Great Notary;
 Pisarz skarbowy koronny i litewski – Crown and Lithuanian Treasury Notary;
 Kusztosz koronny – Crown Keeper;
 Skarbny litewski – Lithuanian Treasurer;
 Instygator koronny i litewski – Crown and Lithuanian State Prosecutor;
 Geometra litewski – Lithuanian Surveyor General;
 Wojski litewski – Lithuanian Wojski;
 Piwniczy litewski – Lithuanian Cellar-Master.

Military offices
The highest military officials were the Hetmans. As with most offices in the Polish–Lithuanian Commonwealth, "hetman" was a job for life and its holder could not be removed even if he was a poor commander. Until the beginning of the 18th century, hetmans were not paid for their services.

Hetmans were very independent; they could maintain their own foreign contacts with the Ottoman Empire, Russia and the Tatars. They allocated their military budgets as they saw fit. As the highest military commanders and administrators, hetmans made administrative and juridical law concerning the military; from 1590, such law had the same force as the Sejm's legislation.

A Hetman's symbol of office was a mace (buława), which was added to his coat of arms. There were two kinds of hetman (in addition to the division into Crown and Lithuanian)—"Great" and "Field." Field Hetmans were subordinate to Great Hetmans, and were sometimes called "Border Hetmans" (hetmani kresowi), since they had evolved from commanders of permanent garrisons on Poland's  southeastern borders (a great school of warfare, since it was an area almost constantly under attack by the Ottoman Turks and the Tatars).

The Hetmans chose a commissioner for a two-year period who commanded the Commonwealth's Cossack troops. Below the Hetmans were Deputy Hetmans titled Regimentarz, who commanded voivodeship levées en masse.

Hetman and Regimentarz were accompanied by a staff of officers titled Great Guard, Field Guard, Field Clerk, Great Quartermaster and Field Quartermaster. These officers were salaried (the Lithuanian Field Guard, Field Clerk and Quartermaster received 15,000 zlotys per annum; the Crown Field Clerk, 30,000).

The Great Guard directed the scout forces while on the march and in camp and commanded the advance guard (however, if both Hetmans were present, the Field Hetman acted as Great Guard). Field Guards were found only on the eastern borders.

The Field Clerks kept accounts of men, equipment and weapons, and paid the soldiers' wages.

The Quartermasters selected campsites, built the camps, and provided logistics and camp security.

After 1635, several new military titles were created:
 1637 – General of Artillery (responsible for artillery forces and their logistics);
 1670s – General of Logistics; General of Medics; General of Finances.

The combat readiness of troops was overseen by Inspectors General (however, it is unclear exactly when "in the 17th century" they were created).

List of military offices
 Hetman Wielki Koronny – Crown Grand Hetman;
 Hetman Wielki Litewski – Lithuanian Grand Hetman;
 Hetman Polny Koronny – Crown Field Hetman;
 Hetman Polny Litewski – Lithuanian Field Hetman;
 Strażnik Wielki Koronny – Crown Great Guard;
 Strażnik Wielki Litewski – Lithuanian Great Guard;
 Strażnik Polny Koronny – Crown Field Guard;
 Strażnik Polny Litewski – Lithuanian Field Guard;
 Pisarz Polny Koronny – Crown Field Clerk;
 Pisarz Polny Litewski – Lithuanian Field Clerk;
 Oboźny Wielki Koronny – Crown Great Quartermaster;
 Oboźny Wielki Litewski – Lithuanian Great Quartermaster;
 Oboźny Polny Koronny – Crown Field Quartermaster;
 Oboźny Polny Litewski – Lithuanian Field Quartermaster;
 Sędzia Wojskowy Koronny – Crown Military Judge;
 Sędzia Wojskowy Litewski – Lithuanian Military Judge;
 Generał artylerii koronny i litewski – Crown and Lithuanian General of Artillery;
 Regent Wojski litewski – Lithuanian Wojski Regent;
 Regimentarz – Deputy Hetman;
 Rotmistrz – Commander of an infantry or cavalry regiment;
 Towarzysz – Cavalry officer (literally, "Companion");
 Towarzysz husarski – Hussar officer;
 Towarzysz pancerny – Light cavalry officer;
 Pocztowy – Cavalry trooper.

District offices
A 1611 Constitution (amended 1633 and 1635) prescribed many officials. Exceptions to the rule, however, were the rule; Sejm rules were treated as mere recommendations. Thus Bełz Voivodeship had only 4 of the 15 prescribed dignitaries; most northern voivodeships had about 5; and in Wołyń and Bracław Voivodeships the hierarchical order was almost reversed. Each province or district had its own set of officials—a list of provinces may be found in the article on provinces and geography of the Polish–Lithuanian Commonwealth.

District officials were appointed by the King, with a few exceptions (local parliaments—sejmiki—chose Chamberlains, District Judges, Deputy District Judges, District Clerks, and in Lithuania also Standard-bearers and District Marshals). Chamberlains, except for the name, had nothing in common with the Court officials of the same name. They administered a court of law (the Chamberlain's Court) which had jurisdiction over property disputes. The District Judge headed the District Court, which had jurisdiction over civil and some criminal matters involving local nobility.

The Starosta generalny ("General Starosta") was the official in charge of a specific territory. The Starosta grodowy ("City Starosta") was in charge of cities, while the Starosta niegrodowy ("Non-City Starosta") was responsible for administration of the Crown lands. These were to be kept in good financial and military order. While in time these administrative responsibilities became smaller (as Kings gave away more and more land), the Starosta remained in charge of the City Courts (sądy grodzkie), which dealt with most criminal matters and had jurisdiction over all local and visiting nobility. They dealt with the most severe cases (killings, rapes, robberies) and were quite harsh (highway robbery was punishable with death), which generally made Poland a safer country than its neighbors. The Starostas also held the "power of the sword", which meant that they enforced the verdicts of all other courts. Non-City Starostas had no juridical powers.

Standard-bearers carried the local banner during Royal ceremonies, and in war when local troops served in the Army. During war, Wojskis maintained order and security in their territories. In Lithuania, the responsibilities of Ciwuns were similar to those of non-city starostas (elders). District marshals presided over local parliaments (in the "Crown", District Marshals were chosen only for the duration of the parliament session, and so were much less powerful than those of Lithuania, who were chosen for life).

Crown
 Podkomorzy – Chamberlain
 Starosta grodowy – Mayor
 Chorąży – Standard-bearer
 Sędzia ziemski – District Judge
 Stolnik – Pantler
 Podczaszy – Royal Cupbearer
 Podsędek – Deputy District Judge
 Podstoli – Steward
 Cześnik – Cupbearer
 Łowczy – Master of the Hunt
 Wojski większy – Major Wojski
 Pisarz ziemski – District Clerk
 Miecznik – Sword-bearer
 Wojski mniejszy – Minor Wojski
 Skarbnik – Treasurer

Lithuania
 Marszałek ziemski – District Marshal 
 Ciwun – Bailiff
 Podkomorzy – Chamberlain
 Starosta grodzki – Mayor
 Chorąży – Standard-bearer
 Sędzia ziemski – District judge
 Wojski większy – Major Wojski
 Stolnik – Pantler
 Podstoli – Steward
 Pisarz ziemski – District Clerk
 Podwojewódzki, Podstarosta – Deputy Voivod, Deputy Starosta
 Sędzia grodzki – City Judge
 Pisarz grodzki – City Clerk
 Podczaszy – Royal Cupbearer 
 Cześnik – Cupbearer
 Horodniczy – Castellan
 Skarbnik – Treasurer
 Łowczy – Master of the Hunt
 Miecznik – Sword-bearer
 Koniuszy – Equerry
 Oboźny – Quartermaster
 Strażnik – Guard
 Krajczy – Carver
 Leśniczy – Forester
 Mostowniczy – Custodian of Bridges
 Budowniczy – Architect

Prussia
 Podkomorzy – Chamberlain
 Chorąży – Standard-bearer
 Sędzia – Judge
 Ławnik – Alderman 
 Pisarz – Clerk
 Podwojewoda – Deputy Voivod (Deputy Governor)

Borough and judicial offices 
The most important official was the Starosta. He was supported by a Borough Substarosta (podstarości grodowy), Burgrave (Burgrabia), Notary (Notariusz) and Scriptor (Pisarz). The Borough Substarosta assisted the Starosta and in his absence acted in his name with all his powers. Lower city officials were the Borough Regent (rejent grodzki), Borough Notary (notariusz grodzki), Borough Scriptor (pisarz grodzki) and common clerks ("subclerks" — podpiskowie).

In the eastern territories bordering on Russia, from 1667, a "Border Judge" cooperated with Russian judges in cases involving parties from the two countries; his rulings were final.

Judges were chosen from among the local hereditary nobles and had little formal training; therefore the quality of the courts varied from judge to judge, and levels of corruption were high. Attorneys, on the other hand, were required to have professional training. Sometimes a court included an asesor, who assisted the judge and collected fines and fees. Prosecutors were extremely rare. Instygators maintained order and security on court grounds, and a court runner (woźny) delivered summons.

List of borough and judicial offices
 Podstarosta grodowy – Borough Substarost
 Burgrabia – Burgrave
 Notariusz – Notary
 Rejent grodzki – Borough Regent
 Sędzia grodzki – Borough Judge
 Podsędek grodzki – Borough Subjudge
 Pisarz grodzki – Borough Clerk

In 1717 the "Numb Diet" barred non-Roman Catholics from being elected Envoys (to the Parliament), and to any other land offices if there was another Roman Catholic contender. The rights of the "Dissidents", as they were called, were reinstated in 1768, and in 1772 their representation in the Diet was limited to a statutory of two members. These rules were finally abolished in 1792 by the 3rd May Constitution.

Town and village offices
These offices were very stable, having evolved about the 13th century and lasting almost unchanged to the end of the Polish–Lithuanian Commonwealth. The administrative system had come from Germany together with Magdeburg law.

Every city (without exception) had a Council and a Bench, the Council being the administrative branch and the Bench the judicial branch. A new Council was chosen by the old one whose term had expired. The Council was responsible for administration, law, privileges, security, finances, guild oversight, and the like. The Council chose the Mayor, and its members' decision was final—even the Starosta or Voivode could only listen to the Mayor's swearing-in and could not refuse to give him his seal. The Council met daily in the larger cities, less often in smaller ones.

The Mayor headed the Council and controlled the executive branch. He was responsible for conciliation, the care of the poor, and maintaining order by suppressing alcohol abuse and games of chance. Second to the Mayor was the Council Clerk, who ran the City Chancellery. The City Clerk (Syndyk Miejski) collected city taxes and supervised the tax collectors. Security and order in the city were the responsibility of the Hutman. He also supervised the city jail and the keyman who unlocked and locked the city gates at dawn and dusk.

The Lonar was the city treasurer, who oversaw its finances. He supervised the officials who controlled marketplace scales to ensure fair trade. Large cities also had scores of less common officials, such as Pipemasters, responsible for pipes and wells; Fire Chiefs; and City Translators, who assisted foreigners and looked out for spies.

The Bench was chaired by a wójt. He and the other Bench members were chosen by the Council for a year's term from among lesser city officials (writers, clerks, etc.).

City Chief Executioners executed not only criminals sentenced by the Bench, but often criminals sentenced by other non-military courts in Poland. They were well paid, sometimes functioned as physicians, but were also often considered social outcasts and lived outside the city walls.

A village mayor was called the sołtys and was the administrative, executive and judicial chief for the village, responsible only to the village's owner.

List of town and village offices
 Burmistrz – City Mayor;
 Wójt – Advocate-Mayor;
 Pisarz rady – Council Clerk;
 Syndyk miejski – City Clerk;
 Hutman – Constable;
 Lonar – City Treasurer.

Other
 Starosta grodowy, Starosta sądowy – City Starosta, Judicial Starosta;
 Starosta generalny wielkopolski – General Starosta of Wielkopolska;
 Starosta generalny małopolski – General Starosta of Małopolska;
 Burgrabia zamku krakowskiego – Burgrave of Kraków Castle;
 Surrogat – Surrogate.

Fictional offices
Fictional or fictitious offices were a specific kind of offices, as they referred to the territories which Polish–Lithuanian Commonwealth lost in the second half of the 17th century either to the Swedish Empire or the Tsardom of Russia. Following the Treaty of Oliva (1660), the Commonwealth officially lost Wenden Voivodeship, Parnawa Voivodeship, and Dorpat Voivodeship. Furthermore, as a result of the Truce of Andrusovo (1667), Poland-Lithuania lost Smolensk Voivodeship and Czernihow Voivodeship.

Despite the fact that these territories did not belong to the Commonwealth any longer, and were under foreign rule, their administration existed for further 100 years, until the Partitions of Poland, with a complex hierarchy of all kinds of regional offices. The existence of fictional titles was the result of the special role of offices in the minds of the Polish–Lithuanian nobility: even though these offices were only honorary, without any material privileges and salaries, they determined social status of their bearers. Furthermore, having a title, albeit fictional, emphasized the position of an individual nobleman as a keen citizen and co-creator of the Commonwealth.

After Czernihow Voivodeship was detached from Poland in 1667, sejmiks of the former province took place at Wlodzimierz Wolynski, some 500 kilometers west of Czernihow. Polish kings continued to present fictional titles of voivodes, senators, deputies, and starostas of Czernihow to their courtiers. In 1785, Stanisław August Poniatowski gave fictitious title of starosta of Nowogrod Siewierski to Tadeusz Czacki.

See also
 List of szlachta
 Hetmans of the Polish–Lithuanian Commonwealth
 Order of precedence in the Polish–Lithuanian Commonwealth
 Szlachta
 Table of Ranks

References

  Urzędy główne i sejmowanie do połowy XVIII w. "Dzieje administracji w Polsce w zarysie", Feliks Koneczny, Polish
 Piotr Konieczny, 163xPolishTitles, Officials in 1st Rzeczpospolita – article discussing organisation of officialdome in Polish–Lithuanian Commonwealth, doc format